Hal Whitehead is a biologist specializing in the study of the sperm whale (Physeter macrocephalus). Whitehead is professor at Dalhousie University. The primary field research vessel of his laboratory is the Balaena, a Valiant 40 ocean-going cruising boat, which normally does its work off the coast of Nova Scotia.  Other marine mammals studied by Whitehead's laboratory include beluga whales, pilot whales, northern bottlenose whales, and bottlenose dolphins.

Research findings
Whitehead's research is focused primarily upon the behavior, population biology, and ecology of the sperm whale.  Topics include social structure, cultural transmission of behavior, as well as acoustic communicative behavior such as click trains.

Selected publications
 Whitehead, H. (2003). Sperm Whales: Social Evolution in the Ocean. 456 p., 60 halftones, 84 line drawings, 41 tables. 6 x 9. Chicago: University of Chicago Press.
 Whitehead, H. and Luke Rendell. (2014). The Cultural Lives of Whales and Dolphins. 408 p., 15 color plates, 7 halftones, 4 line drawings, 5 tables. 6 x 9. Chicago: University of Chicago Press, .

See also
Beaked whale
Sperm whale

External links
 Dalhousie University Whitehead Lab

Cetologists
Living people
1952 births